Peter Milliman is an American lacrosse coach and former professional player. In 2020, he was named the 23rd head coach in Johns Hopkins Blue Jays men's lacrosse history after serving as the Richard M. Moran Head Coach for the Cornell Big Red men's lacrosse for three seasons.

Early life and education
Milliman was born and raised by a single mother in Rochester, New York. While attending Brighton High School, Milliman began playing lacrosse in order to stay in shape for football season. He was also inspired by Indigenous coach Sid Jamieson at a summer camp to continue playing the game. Following high school, he attended Gettysburg College where he was a three-time Division III All-America and three-time All-Centennial Conference pick. However, he struggled academically at Gettysburg and dropped out of the school with no more athletic eligibility and a few credits short of graduating.

Career
Upon leaving Gettysburg, Milliman was drafted in the fifth-round, 26th overall, by the Rochester Rattlers in the 2003 Major League Lacrosse’s (MLL) Supplemental Draft. He went on to play professionally for four years with Rattlers, winning an MLL Championship in 2008. While playing professional lacrosse, Milliman served as an assistant coach for the RIT Tigers and Siena College. After winning an MLL Championship, Milliman was named men's assistant lacrosse coach at Pfeiffer University for the Pfeiffer Falcons. While serving in this role, he was the recipient of two Conference Carolinas Coach of the Year awards. He stayed in this role until 2012 when he accepted an assistant defensive coordinator position at Princeton University. As the assistant defensive coordinator, he helped the Tigers to a 9–6 record overall and a mark of 3–3 in the Ivy League during the 2013 season.

After one year at Princeton, Milliman was named Princeton's offensive coordinator but chose to leave and accept an assistant coach position for the Cornell Big Red men's lacrosse team. During the 2014 campaign, Milliman helped the team to a 9–0 record to begin the season and 11–5 overall. As a result, he was named the Mario St. George Boiardi '04 Associate Head Coach of Men's Lacrosse. During the offseason, he chose to serve as a volunteer head coach for Team Russia at the 2014 World Lacrosse Championship after being recruited by Eugene Arkhipov. Prior to this, he had been unaware Russia had a lacrosse team and had never seen any of the players compete live.

Milliman was made Richard M. Moran Head Coach of Men's Lacrosse in 2018 and in his first season, the team qualified for the NCAA quarterfinals for the first time in two years. The team went on to finish second in the conference and won the program's first Ivy League Tournament title since 2011. The following year, he was named an assistant coach for Team USA at the 2019 World Indoor Lacrosse Championship where he helped them to their fifth straight bronze medal.

During the COVID-19 pandemic, Milliman was named the 23rd head coach in Johns Hopkins Blue Jays men's lacrosse history.

Personal life
Milliman is married to Megan Milliman (nee Fox), a lacrosse coach at Wells College. They have two daughters together.

References

Living people
Rochester Rattlers players
American lacrosse players
Gettysburg College alumni
Cornell Big Red men's lacrosse coaches
Johns Hopkins Blue Jays men's lacrosse coaches
Year of birth missing (living people)
Sportspeople from Rochester, New York